Cedric Hayden may refer to:
 Cedric Lee Hayden (born 1934), Oregon state representative from 1985 to 1993
 Cedric Ross Hayden, Oregon state representative from 2015 to present